Countess Palatine Ernestine of Sulzbach (15 May 169714 April 1775) was the wife of Landgrave William "the Younger" of Hesse-Wanfried and after his death prioress of the Carmelite monastery in Neuburg an der Donau as Sister Teodora.

Early life 
She was the third daughter of the Duke Theodore Eustace of Sulzbach and his wife Landgravine Maria Eleonore of Hesse-Rotenburg.  The Dukes and Counts Palatine of Sulzbach were a collateral line of the House of Wittelsbach.

Life 
Ernestine and her older sister Countess Palatine Francisca Christina of Sulzbach were brought up in Essen Abbey.  Emperor Charles VI arranged her marriage with the 48-year-old William the Younger of Hesse-Wanfried-Rheinfels.  The marriage took place on 19 September 1719 and remained childless.  After her husband died in 1731, she initially lived at Rheinfels Castle, later she moved into the Carmelites monastery in Neuburg an der Donau, where she was known under the religious name Sister Teodora and eventually became prioress.  According to Torsy and Kracht, she was a model for her sisters of obedience, humility and love of poverty.  She had a reputation of sanctity when she died in 1775.  She was buried in the Court Church in Neuburg.

References 
 Chronicle of Wanfried (Unpublished)
 J. Torsy and H.J. Kracht: Der Große Namenstagskalender, Freiburg, Basel and Vienna, 2002

External links 
Article about Ernestine of Sulzbach
 
 Entry for Ernestine of Bavaria at the Ecumenical Saints Lexicon

1697 births
1775 deaths
17th-century German people
18th-century German people
German countesses
Carmelite nuns
House of Wittelsbach
Burials in Bavaria
Daughters of monarchs